McCormick County Courthouse is a historic courthouse building located at McCormick in McCormick County, South Carolina.  It was designed by architect G. Lloyd Preacher and built in 1923.  It is a two-story, Classical Revival style brick building.  It features a large two-story portico with Doric order columns and pilasters.

It was listed on the National Register of Historic Places in 1985.

References

County courthouses in South Carolina
Courthouses on the National Register of Historic Places in South Carolina
Government buildings completed in 1923
Buildings and structures in McCormick County, South Carolina
National Register of Historic Places in McCormick County, South Carolina